Hirasea chichijimana is a species of small air-breathing land snail, a terrestrial pulmonate gastropod mollusc in the family Endodontidae.

The width of the shell is 1.5 mm. The height of the shell is 3 mm. This is an endangered species.

Distribution
This species (and indeed the whole genus) is endemic to Japan.

References

原色日本陸産貝類図鑑 (保育社の原色図鑑 (61))

Molluscs of Japan
Endodontidae
Taxonomy articles created by Polbot